WIRO may refer to:

 Wyoming Infrared Observatory
 WIRO (FM), a radio station (107.1 FM) licensed to serve Ironton, Ohio, United States
 WKSG (FM), a radio station (98.3 FM) licensed to serve Garrison, Kentucky, United States, which held the call sign WIRO in 2022
 WITO, a radio station (1230 AM) licensed to serve Ironton, Ohio, which held the call sign WIRO from 1951 to 2022